Robert Frank Ruers (born 24 May 1947) is a Dutch politician and attorney. On behalf of the Socialist Party (SP) he was a member of the Senate four times and briefly a deputy of the provincial executive of Limburg.

Career
Ruers grew up in Sittard, Limburg, where he attended gymnasium at the Bisschoppelijk College. Initially he wanted to become a priest. During his studies in Utrecht he became a member of the SP in 1972. Educated in private law, Ruers worked successively at the GAK and the NOS. From 1980 he was a lawyer and attorney at law.

In 1986, Ruers became the first municipal councilor for the SP in Utrecht. He was a councilor and parliamentary leader until 2001. He was also associated with the national party apparatus of the SP, especially in legal matters. In 1995 he was the initiator of the Comité Asbestslachtoffers (CAS; 'Asbestos Victims Committee') affiliated with the SP. He conducted, among other things, compensation claims for former employees of Eternit, who had contracted cancer as a result of exposure to asbestos.

On 19 May 1998, Ruers first became a member of the Senate, as interim successor to Jan de Wit, who left for the House of Representatives. As a one-man faction and from 1999 a member of a two-man faction, he was involved in very diverse matters in the Senate. In 2003 he retired from politics to focus more on legal support for the CAS.

On 12 December 2006, he was sworn in again as a member of the Senate, succeeding Ronald van Raak, who was elected to the House of Representatives in the 2006 general election. In the 2007 Senate election, Ruers was not in an eligible position. In the 2011 Senate election, Ruers was in an eligible position and was re-elected to the Senate.

In March 2012, he obtained his doctorate at Erasmus University Rotterdam with a thesis entitled "Power and Countervailing Power in Dutch Asbestos Regulations". On 20 June 2018, Ruers left the Senate after he was sworn in as a member of the Limburg provincial executive on 15 June. He remained active in the provincial government for only a few months. After speaking out against a wind turbine plan that the coalition in Limburg was in favor of, GroenLinks submitted a motion of censure in September 2018. Because the Labour Party and Democrats 66 appeared to support the motion, the SP withdrew Ruers and SP deputy Marleen van Rijnsbergen from the board.

In the 2019 Senate election, he was in an ineligible place on the list of candidates and was not re-elected.

References

External links
  Socialist Party biography
  Parlement.com biography

1947 births
Living people
20th-century Dutch lawyers
Members of the Senate (Netherlands)
Members of the Provincial-Executive of Limburg
People from Sittard
Socialist Party (Netherlands) politicians
Erasmus University Rotterdam alumni
20th-century Dutch politicians
21st-century Dutch politicians